Elly Margaret Tanaka (born 1965) is a biochemist and senior scientist at the Research Institute of Molecular Pathology (IMP) in Vienna, Austria. Tanaka studies the molecular cell biology of limb and spinal cord regeneration as well as the evolution of regeneration.

Early life and education

Tanaka was born in Boston, Massachusetts, and obtained a bachelor's degree in biochemistry from Harvard University in 1987 and a PhD from the University of California, San Francisco in 1993, where she had worked in the lab of Marc W. Kirschner. She then became a postdoctoral researcher in the lab of Jeremy Brockes at University College London and  Ludwig Institute.

Research and career 
Tanaka started her own lab at the Max Planck Institute of Molecular Cell Biology and Genetics (MPI-CBG) in Dresden (Germany) in 1999. Her research focused on axolotl spinal cord regeneration.

In 2008, Tanaka became a professor at the Center for Regenerative Therapies Dresden (CRTD) of the Technische Universität Dresden. She became director of the center in 2014, before becoming senior scientist at the Research Institute of Molecular Pathology (IMP) in Vienna in 2016. The Mexican salamander species axolotl is Tanaka's main model system for her research and is also working to translate them to mouse and human tissue. Using innovative molecular biology and microscopy methods, she identified those stem cells that underlie the regeneration of limbs and the spinal cord.
She is a member of the Editorial Board for Developmental Cell.

Awards and honours

Tanaka was elected a member of the Academia Europaea in 2015, of the European Molecular Biology Organisation in 2017, and the Austrian Academy of Sciences in 2021. She was awarded the Ernst Schering Prize in 2017, highlighting Tanaka as "the leading expert in the field of regeneration biology". In 2018, she was awarded the Erwin Schrödinger Prize of the Austrian Academy of Sciences for lifetime achievements. In 2020, she was awarded the FEBS | EMBO Women in Science Award.

References

Members of the European Molecular Biology Organization
Living people
1965 births
21st-century American biologists
Harvard University alumni
University of California, San Francisco alumni